Vibeke Stensrud (born 29 September 1973) is a Norwegian professional golfer. She won the 1993 European Ladies Amateur Championship and played on the Ladies European Tour between 1997 and 2005, with two runner-up finishes.

Amateur career
Stensrud started playing golf at 7 and joined the National Team before she was 15. She won the Norwegian National Golf Championship four times (1990, 1991, 1993 and 1995) and the European Ladies Amateur Championship in 1993. She represented Norway at the Espirito Santo Trophy three times, and  the Continent of Europe at the Vagliano Trophy in 1993 and 1995, winning the latter. Stensrud attended San Jose State University on a golf scholarship, and was one of three finalists for the Honda Sports Award in 1994–95.

Professional career
Stensrud turned professional in 1996 and joined the Ladies European Tour in 1997. She finished 58th on the Order of Merit in her rookie season, and 82nd in 1998 after sustaining an injury to her right arm. She played on the 1999 Ladies Asian Golf Tour and finished fourth at the Malaysia Ladies Open and runner-up at the Philippines Ladies Open.

On the 1999 Ladies European Tour she had her first top-10 finish at the Ladies Italian Open, two strokes behind winner Samantha Head. The following year she finished in a tie for third at the Ladies Irish Open and solo second at the Ladies British Masters, two strokes behind Trish Johnson, for a career-high 17th place in the Order of Merit. In 2003 she tied for second together with Trish Johnson at the Open de France Dames, one stroke behind Lynnette Brooky, ending the season ranked 23rd.

In 2005 Stensrud announced her retirement from tour citing persistent injuries.

Amateur wins (5)
 1990 Norwegian National Golf Championship
 1991 Norwegian National Golf Championship
 1993 European Ladies Amateur Championship
 1993 Norwegian National Golf Championship
 1995 Norwegian National Golf Championship

Results in LPGA majors

CUT = missed the half-way cut.
NT = no tournament

Team appearances
Amateur
European Ladies' Team Championship (representing Norway): 1993, 1995
Vagliano Trophy: (representing the Continent of Europe): 1993, 1995 (winners)
Espirito Santo Trophy (representing Norway): 1988, 1990, 1994

External links

References

Norwegian female golfers
San Jose State Spartans women's golfers
Ladies European Tour golfers
Sportspeople from Oslo
1973 births
Living people